Ralph Marrero (August 21, 1958 – November 16, 1991) was an American actor. He is best remembered for his portrayal of Pvt. Rickles in George A. Romero's post-apocalyptic zombie horror film Day of the Dead (1985). He also appeared in the comedy horror film Tales from the Darkside: The Movie (1990).

Death
He died on November 16, 1991 in an automobile accident in Albuquerque, New Mexico. His final film role was as Ping Bodie in The Babe (1992).

Filmography

References

External links 
 

1957 births
1991 deaths
20th-century American male actors